Chillicothe Independent School District is a public school district based in Chillicothe, Texas (USA).  The district covers eastern Hardeman and northwestern Wilbarger counties. In addition to Chillicothe, the district also serves the unincorporated community of Odell.

Academic achievement
In 2009, the school district was rated "academically acceptable" by the Texas Education Agency.

Schools
Chillicothe High/Junior High School (Grades 7-12)
Chillicothe Elementary School (Grades PK-6)

Special programs

Athletics
Chillicothe High School plays six-man football, volleyball, basketball, baseball, tennis, track, and golf.

See also

List of school districts in Texas

References

External links

School districts in Hardeman County, Texas
School districts in Wilbarger County, Texas